Mount Hermon is a high mountain on the border between Syria and Lebanon.  The name may also refer to:

Places

In the United States 
Mount Hermon, California
Mount Hermon, Kentucky
Mount Hermon, Louisiana
Mount Hermon, Massachusetts
Mount Hermon, New Jersey
Mount Hermon, Alamance County, North Carolina
Mount Hermon Township, Pasquotank County, North Carolina
Mount Hermon, Virginia

Elsewhere 

 Mount Hermon, Cornwall, a hamlet in England

Schools
Northfield Mount Hermon School, a private, college-preparatory school in Massachusetts, United States
Mount Hermon Female Seminary, Mississippi, a former institution of higher education for black women (1875-1924)
Mount Hermon High School, a high school in Mount Hermon, Louisiana, United States
Mount Hermon School, Darjeeling, India

Battles
First Battle of Mount Hermon, fought on October 6, 1973
Second Battle of Mount Hermon, fought on October 8, 1973
Third Battle of Mount Hermon (Operation Dessert), fought on October 21–22, 1973

Other uses
Mount Hermon field mouse, rodent species
Mount Hermon Cemetery, Sillery, Quebec City, Canada